George Dexter Whitcomb (May 13, 1834 – June 21, 1914) an American manufacturer and founder of the town of Glendora, California.

Biography

Early life
Born in Brandon, Vermont to Dexter and Emily (née Tilton) Whitcomb, George Dexter Whitcomb was the second of eight children. The family relocated to Franklin Mills, Ohio (now known as Kent, Ohio), where Dexter worked as a shoemaker and mechanic. Young Whitcomb attended public schools and later worked as a ticketing agent and telegraphist for the Panhandle Railroad to pay his tuition while at business college in Akron, Ohio. This was the beginning of a lifelong career and association with railroading.
 
In 1856, he moved to Saint Paul, Minnesota, to manage a company that was trading with Indians on the frontier. There, in 1857, he met and began courting Leadora Bennett. Leadora was the daughter of Captain Abraham and Elizabeth (Barney) Bennett. Leadora's father was a well known pioneer steamboat captain and owner on the upper Mississippi River. She was born in Wheeling, West Virginia, and had graduated from the Young Ladies Seminary there.

Shortly after their marriage, in 1859, the Whitcombs moved to Chicago, where Whitcomb returned to railroading and became a purchasing agent for the Chicago and Alton Railroad. When the American Civil War broke out, he volunteered for duty with the Union Army, and his service assignment was production of ties and supplies for use on Union railroads. While assigned to the war construction supply, he and Leadora lost their infant son Henry, in January 1864.

Career
After the Civil War, Whitcomb continued to push railroad development. He saw the potential for westward continental expansion and he threw himself into work with the railroads. His endeavors included a construction contract for a major bridge across the Ohio River and several hundred miles of track for the Panhandle Railroad. In an attempt to cheer Leadora and help them through the loss of their infant son, he built a steamboat on the nearby Mississippi River named the Leadora, in her honor.

By 1865, Whitcomb had been promoted to General Purchasing Agent for the Panhandle Railroad, and the family included children George Bennett Whitcomb and Carroll Sylvanus Whitcomb. He was now moving on to ownership of his own company and relocated to Chicago.

Whitcomb Mining and Manufacturing Company
His new company, Whitcomb Mining and Manufacturing Company, was engaged in production of coal mining machinery and coal field development to supply the railroads. In 1871, the disastrous Great Chicago Fire destroyed most of the central city. The offices of the company were relocated to the corner of LaSalle and Adams Street in the Loop area of downtown Chicago. The Schlosser Block, where the company offices were located, was a four-story impressive granite faced building, just doors from the famed "Rookery" building by the architects Burnham and Root. These were heady days in Chicago. A rebirth swept the city after the fire and it was a time for men with ideas and dreams to seize potential.

Whitcomb was swept into this renaissance and continued the development and manufacture of all manner of mining machinery as well as other kinds of small machinery. With the completion of the First transcontinental railroad in 1869, easier quicker and cheaper methods of locating and processing coal were now in great demand. That demand drove the need for more advanced drilling and processing machinery as well as a safer method to transport the coal from the inside of the mines. Men with pickaxes and mules and wagons had long been the means of locating and moving the coal to the surface. Whitcomb recognized the need for more advanced methods and went on to invent a small battery operated locomotive that would pull coal cars safely from the mines. He also developed more precise coal drills and processing machinery that sped up as well as made safer the coal mining process.

By the late 1870s George Whitcomb had a successful company and a fine home in the Drexel Park area of Chicago and his family had grown once again to include William Card Whitcomb, Leadora Whitcomb, Elizabeth Emily Whitcomb, and Virginia Whitcomb.

However, the failing health of his son Carroll and the continued health problems of his beloved wife forced dramatic changes on the family very quickly. Through his entire life, Whitcomb was a dedicated husband and family man and his foremost thoughts were always of his family's security and wellbeing.  Remembering the pain of the loss of their son, the couple was willing to do whatever the doctors advised to recover the health of both Carroll and Leadora. A milder climate such as Arizona or Southern California was suggested, and the Whitcombs soon began investigating the Los Angeles area. Since the expansion of the railroads was complete, travel that before took four to six months time overland, had now been reduced to six days. The western states were now much more attractive and the more temperate climate of Southern California was the place where people went to escape the harsh winters and humid summers of the east coast.

Southern California
Using the same attention he had to previously concentrated on his company, Whitcomb scoured the Los Angeles Basin, and determined that he should relocate the family there. He would continue to run his company, now renamed the Whitcomb Locomotive Works, through the means of telegraph messages and with the assistance of trusted employees in the Chicago offices. By the early 1880s the family was living in a rented home near downtown Los Angeles and Whitcomb was homing in on the location for his latest and most lasting endeavor, the creation of a new foothill town.

Glendora
He finally settled on a parcel of land that had once been a western section of the Mexican land grant Rancho Azusa de Dalton. He purchased several hundred acres and became associated with John W. Cook, a Los Angeles County Board of Supervisors member, and Merrick Reynolds, the owner of the San Pedro Lumber Company. The three formed the Glendora Land Company and the Glendora Water Company. Whitcomb constructed a 26-room villa at the northernmost end of Vista Bonita Avenue. He laid out groves of oranges, and other citrus and deciduous fruit trees around his residence. Once his residence was established and his family was settled, his work began in earnest to develop the plans for his new town.

He chose the name Glendora, a combination of two words, the first being the location of his new home in a glen of the foothills of the San Gabriel Mountains, and the second was his wife's nickname (Dora). Combined they became "Glendora."

The company set about to establish infrastructures that would support a "family town" founded with a sense of permanence and values. The company built a hotel, the Belleview, and a land office. both were elegant structures in Victorian architectural styles. Whitcomb donated the land and $5,000 for the construction of a school. He also donated land for the Methodist Church. Drilling equipment was brought in to locate a reliable source of water. Streets were graded, laid out, and named. Thousands of Peruvian pepper trees (Schinus molle) were planted.

Whitcomb entered into negotiations with Atchison, Topeka and Santa Fe Railway executives to relocate the new southern transcontinental line's planned local route to the north of the San Jose Hills (South Hills) for the town's prospering. He used his past affiliations with rail officials, and could be seen assisting the survey crews, to bring the route along the southern border of the town's site. He then brought the L.A. city newspaper "The Signal" out to the new town, to publicize the local improvements and attract new lot sales. The town development was designed to attract "solid" white families as residents, who needed schools, churches, and upstanding businesses. Completing Glendora's infrastructure and subdividing lots for residential development was accomplished in less than three years.

Whitcomb continued his untiring interest and devotion to Glendora for the next 30 years. The Whitcomb home was a center of activity during these years. Guests ranged from the Bovards of the newly established University of Southern California, to civic leaders from the city and county of Los Angeles and other parts of California, as well as business leaders from around the region and country. During those years, he was able to convince Glendorans to delay the incorporation of Glendora (est. 1911) until the Los Angeles County Board of Supervisors agreed to pave Foothill Boulevard and make several other civic improvements in the town using Los Angeles County funds.

He worked to bring the light rail Pacific Electric Red Cars to serve Glendora, resulting in the Monrovia–Glendora Line connecting the town with Downtown Los Angeles and numerous other lines across Greater Los Angeles. Whitcomb helped to form the Glendora School District, and served on its first board of trustees.
 
He and Leadora continued to travel regularly to Chicago, and to Rochelle where his Geo D. Whitcomb Company factory had been relocated in Illinois, to check on his company, which was by now manufacturing locomotives, an automobile, small machinery, and mining equipment. They also traveled regularly to Sacramento, California to follow the state legislature.

Death
On June 21, 1914, after a lifetime of achievements, George Dexter Whitcomb died at his home in Glendora, at the age of 80. He is buried in Inglewood Cemetery, in Los Angeles. He left his beloved wife Leadora, three surviving sons and three daughters. His company, the Whitcomb Locomotive Works continued to operate until 1930, when controlling interest was sold to Baldwin Locomotives. His beautiful home in Glendora, known as "The White House," was destroyed by fire in the 1920s.  In his honor today in Glendora there remains, Whitcomb Avenue, Whitcomb High School and The Whitcomb Courtyard at the Glendora Historical Society on Glendora Avenue. But surely the greatest tribute to his memory was the founding of the city of Glendora, California.

See also
Geo D. Whitcomb Company
Partin Manufacturing Company (automobile company)

External links
Animated Biographic web page of George Dexter Whitcomb - An LA Genealogy Project Biography, with photographs and company logo
North East Rail Fans Web Page with photographs of Whitcomb Locomotives and history of the company

American city founders
American company founders
American landowners
American manufacturing businesspeople
American real estate businesspeople
1834 births
1914 deaths
Businesspeople from Chicago
Businesspeople from Los Angeles

Businesspeople from Akron, Ohio
People from Brandon, Vermont
People from Rochelle, Illinois
Glendora, California
Real estate and property developers
Union Army officers
19th-century American businesspeople
Military personnel from California
Military personnel from Illinois